Jack pine (Pinus banksiana) is an eastern North American pine. Its native range in Canada is east of the Rocky Mountains from the Mackenzie River in the Northwest Territories to Cape Breton Island in Nova Scotia, and the north-central and northeast of the United States from Minnesota to Maine, with the southernmost part of the range just into northwest Indiana and northwest Pennsylvania. It is also known as grey pine and scrub pine.

In the far west of its range, Pinus banksiana hybridizes readily with the closely related lodgepole pine (Pinus contorta). The species epithet banksiana is after the English botanist Sir Joseph Banks.

Description 

Some jack pines are shrub-sized, due to poor growing conditions. They do not usually grow perfectly straight, resulting in an irregular shape similar to pitch pine (Pinus rigida). This pine often forms pure stands on sandy or rocky soil. It is fire-adapted to stand-replacing fires, with the cones remaining closed for many years, until a forest fire kills the mature trees and opens the cones, reseeding the burnt ground.

The bundle-sheath is persistent. The buds are blunt pointed, up to 15 mm long, reddish-brown, and resinous. On vigorous shoots, there is more than one cyclic component. The bark is thin, reddish-brown to gray in color in juvenile stages. As the tree matures it becomes dark brown and flaky. The wood is moderately hard and heavy, weak, light brown colour. The seed cones vary in shape, being rectangular to oval, cone shaped, straight or curved inward.

Unusually for a pine, the cones normally point forward along the branch, sometimes curling around it. That is an easy way to tell it apart from the similar lodgepole pine in more western areas of North America. The cones on mature trees are serotinous. The typical case is in a fire, however cones on the lower branches can open when temperatures reach  due to the heat being reflected off the ground.

Ecology 

Kirtland's warbler (Setophaga kirtlandii), a formerly endangered bird, depends on pure stands of young jack pine in a very limited area in the north of the Lower and Upper Peninsulas of Michigan for breeding. Most known nesting areas are limited to Crawford, Oscoda, and Ogemaw counties. Mature jack pine forests are usually open and blueberries are often abundant in the understory.

Young jack pines are an alternate host for sweet fern blister rust (Cronartium comptoniae). Infected sweet ferns (Comptonia peregrina) release powdery orange spores in the summer and nearby trees become infected in the fall. Diseased trees show vertical orange cankers on the trunk and galls on the lower branches. The disease does not tend to affect older trees.

Jack pines are also susceptible to scleroderris canker (Gremmeniella abietina). This disease manifests by yellowing at the base of the needles. Prolonged exposure may lead to eventual death of the tree.

Insects that attack jack pine stands include the white pine weevil (Pissodes strobi), jack pine sawfly, and jack pine budworm (Choristoneura pinus).

Fossil evidence shows the jack pine survived the glacial period in the Appalachian and Ozark Mountains.

Commercial uses 
Like other species of pine, Pinus banksiana has use as timber, although its wood tends to be knotty and not highly resistant to decay. Products include pulpwood, fuel, decking, and utility poles.

References

Bibliography 
 
 National Geographic Field Guide to Trees of North America.

External links 

Pinus
Pinus taxa by common names
Flora of Eastern Canada
Flora of the Northeastern United States
Flora of the North-Central United States
Flora of the Great Lakes region (North America)
Trees of Saskatchewan
Trees of Alberta
Trees of the Northeastern United States
Trees of Ontario
Trees of the United States
Trees of the Great Lakes region (North America)
Least concern flora of North America
Least concern flora of the United States